Open skies refers to various aviation laws jointly called "freedoms of the air".

It may also refer to:

Entertainment
 Fliers of the Open Skies, 1977 Croatian film directed by Marijan Arhanić
 Open Skies, Closed Minds, 1999 book on UFOs by Nick Pope
 Rip Open the Skies, 2006 album by the Christian rock band Remedy Drive
 Open Skies (song), 2008 Reamonn song

Aviation policy
 ASEAN Open Skies, aviation policy
 EU–US Open Skies Agreement, 2008 EU-US aviation pact
 Treaty on Open Skies, 2002

Other uses
 OpenSkies, British Airways subsidiary airline
 OC-135B Open Skies, reconnaissance aircraft utilized by the U.S. Air Force

See also
 Open Sky (disambiguation)